Kimbiri is a district in the western La Convención Province in Peru. It is bordered by Ayacucho Region on the west, Pichari District on the north,  Echarate District on the east, and   Vilcabamba District on the south.

Ethnic groups 
The people in the district are mainly indigenous citizens of Quechua descent. Quechua is the language which the majority of the population (63.57%) learnt to speak in childhood, 29.32% of the residents started speaking using the Spanish language (2007 Peru Census).

External links
  Municipalidad Distrital de Kimbiri
  Kimbiri Tour

Districts of the La Convención Province
Districts of the Cusco Region